Su Yiping (born August 4, 1979 in Changshu, Suzhou, Jiangsu) is a female Chinese hurdler. Her personal best time is 12.91 seconds, achieved in October 1999 in Huizhou.

Competition record

References

1979 births
Living people
Sportspeople from Suzhou
Runners from Jiangsu
Chinese female hurdlers
Olympic athletes of China
Athletes (track and field) at the 2004 Summer Olympics
Asian Games medalists in athletics (track and field)
Athletes (track and field) at the 2002 Asian Games
World Athletics Championships athletes for China
Universiade medalists in athletics (track and field)
Asian Games silver medalists for China
Medalists at the 2002 Asian Games
Universiade gold medalists for China
People from Changshu
Medalists at the 2001 Summer Universiade
20th-century Chinese women
21st-century Chinese women